Backstreet's Back is the second studio album by American boy band Backstreet Boys, released internationally on August 11, 1997, by Jive Records and Trans Continental Records, with the exception of United States. It was a follow-up to their successful debut album Backstreet Boys (1996). Some songs from this album and the debut album were compiled into a second self-titled album, Backstreet Boys (1997), which was released only in the US.

There were a few differences between the versions of songs released on this album and the American album. The album also contained the same enhanced section as the American release. The first track recorded for the album was a cover of "Set Adrift on Memory Bliss", which was recorded alongside a new song, "If You Stay", which did not make the final track listing of the album. "Who Do You Love" was performed live but never released as a studio track. The three singles released from this album became three of their most successful and remembered singles.

Commercial performance
Backstreet's Back debuted at #1 in Canada, selling 67,000 copies in its first week. By 2007, the album had sold over 1,048,000 copies in Canada.

Track listing

Notes
"Set Adrift on Memory Bliss" contains an interpolation of "True" written by Gary Kemp and performed by Spandau Ballet; and a sample from "How High" written by Erick Sermon, Reggie Noble, and Clifford Smith and performed by Method Man & Redman.

Charts

Weekly charts

Year-end charts

Certifications and sales

See also
 List of best-selling albums in Argentina
 List of best-selling albums in Brazil
 List of best-selling albums in Canada
 List of best-selling albums in Germany
 List of best-selling albums in Spain
 List of best-selling albums

References

1997 albums
Backstreet Boys albums
Jive Records albums
Albums produced by Max Martin
Albums recorded at Cheiron Studios
Albums recorded at Polar Studios